Shani Prabhava is a 1977 black and white Kannada film directed by Ratnakar-Madhu and starring actors Vishnuvardhan and Bhavani.

Plot

Cast

 Vishnuvardhan
 Bhavani
 Sampath
 K. S. Ashwath
 B. Saroja Devi
 Udaya Kumar
 Gangadhar
 Balakrishna
 Subba Rao
 Saraswathi
 Indrani
 Ramkumar
 Rajasree
 Dikki Madhavarao
 Thoogudeepa Srinivas
 Anantharam Maccheri
 Srinivas Iyengar
 Kumari Chaya
 Chandra Shekar

Soundtrack
The music was composed by M. Ranga Rao.

References

External links
 Shani Prabhava at the Internet Movie Database
 

1977 films
1970s Kannada-language films
Films scored by M. Ranga Rao